Sławomir Borowiecki (born 19 May 1977) is a Polish former competitive pair skater. He competed with Magdalena Sroczyńska and Rita Chałubińska. He finished among the top four at the 1996 World Junior Championships.

Borowiecki has performed with his wife, Sherri Kennedy-Borowiecka, in Holiday on Ice. In 2007, he and partner Sita Vermeulen won the Dutch version of Dancing on Ice (see: Sterren dansen op het ijs). He won the Polish edition twice — with Olga Borys in December 2007 and with Aleksandra Szwed in May 2008.

Competitive highlights
(with Chałubińska)

(with Sroczyńska)

Sources
Holiday on Ice official homepage
Pairs on Ice profile

Polish male pair skaters
Living people
1977 births
Sportspeople from Łódź